Andrés Gómez was the defending champion, but lost in the quarterfinals to Diego Pérez.

Hans Gildemeister won the title by defeating Pablo Arraya 7–5, 6–1 in the final.

Seeds

Draw

Finals

Top half

Bottom half

References

External links
 Official results archive (ATP)
 Official results archive (ITF)

1982 Grand Prix (tennis)
ATP Bordeaux